Goli Daraq-e Sofla (also Romanized as Golī Daraq-e Soflá; also known as Gol Daraq, Golī Daraq, and Golī Daraq-e Pā’īn) is a village in Salavat Rural District, Moradlu District, Meshgin Shahr County, Ardabil Province, Iran. At the 2006 census, its population was 52, in 8 families.

References 

Towns and villages in Meshgin Shahr County